Brena Carolina Vianna de Oliveira (born 28 October 1996), simply known as Brena, is a Brazilian footballer who plays as a midfielder for Santos FC.

Club career

Born in Rio de Janeiro, Brena finished her formation with Vasco da Gama, making her senior debut with the club in 2014. She moved to Flamengo in the following year, and represented Centro Olímpico in the 2016 season.

On 12 January 2017, Brena signed for Santos. On 11 December of the following year, after being the top goalscorer of the 2018 Copa Libertadores Femenina, she moved abroad with Avaldsnes IL.

Brena returned to Peixe in 2020, but was sidelined in April due to a knee injury.

International career
After representing Brazil at under-17 and under-20 levels in the 2012 South American U-17 Women's Championship, 2012 FIFA U-17 Women's World Cup and 2016 FIFA U-20 Women's World Cup, Brena was called up to the full side by manager Emily Lima on 24 March 2017, for a friendly against Bolivia.

Honours
Santos
Campeonato Brasileiro de Futebol Feminino Série A1: 2017
Campeonato Paulista de Futebol Feminino: 2018
Copa Paulista de Futebol Feminino: 2020

References

1996 births
Living people
Footballers from Rio de Janeiro (city)
Brazilian footballers
Brazilian women's footballers
Women's association football midfielders
Campeonato Brasileiro de Futebol Feminino Série A1 players
Associação Desportiva Centro Olímpico players
Santos FC (women) players
Toppserien players
Avaldsnes IL players
Expatriate women's footballers in Norway
Brazilian expatriate women's footballers
Brazilian expatriate sportspeople in Norway
Clube de Regatas do Flamengo (women) players
CR Vasco da Gama (women) players